Jay Alexander Smith (born 24 September 1981) is an English former professional footballer who played as a midfielder.

Playing career
Smith started his professional football career with Aston Villa. After a season, he was transferred to Southend United.

Signed in 2002 after a successful loan spell and turning down the advances of Hull City, Smith made his debut in August the same year and quickly became a regular in the Blues side.

A horrendous spell of injuries, including a broken ankle, interrupted his career. Towards the end of the 2005–06 season, Smith was loaned out to Oxford United – and despite impressing manager Jim Smith during the run-in, it was not enough to save Oxford from dropping out of the football league.

Steve Tilson has always maintained that there was a place for a fit Jay Smith in the Southend squad and even after speaking to Oxford about a permanent deal for 2006–07, Smith and Southend committed to each other again and he signed on for another year at Roots Hall.

Smith once again found himself on loan, this time with League Two side Notts County.

On 26 January 2007, Smith was released from Southend and made a permanent switch to Notts County after a successful two-month loan spell.

He was released from his contract in January 2009 five months early along with striker Spencer Weir-Daley.

In December 2009, Smith joined Conference North side Eastwood Town on a one-month deal. The following month the deal was extended for another month, but at the end of January, Smith signed for Conference National side Tamworth. It was announced that Smith would be taking over as club captain for the 2010–11 season from former player Chris Smith. On 18 November 2011, Smith was loaned to AFC Telford United until 5 January 2012. Smith said of the move: "In my eyes I've moved to a bigger club. I'm not going back to Tamworth. My time there has finished now."

In January 2012 his contract was cancelled by Tamworth and he joined Telford on a permanent basis. On 2 May 2013 he was let go by the club.

Honours

Club

Southend United
 League Two Play-off Winners: 2004–05

Career statistics

References

External links

Jay Smith at NottsCountyFC.co.uk
Jay Smith at telfordunited.com

1981 births
Living people
Footballers from Greater London
English footballers
Association football midfielders
Aston Villa F.C. players
Southend United F.C. players
Oxford United F.C. players
Notts County F.C. players
Eastwood Town F.C. players
Tamworth F.C. players
AFC Telford United players
English Football League players
National League (English football) players